The 1948 San Jose State Spartans football team represented San Jose State College during the 1948 college football season.

San Jose State competed in the California Collegiate Athletic Association. The team was led by head coach Wilbur V. Hubbard, in his third year, and played home games at Spartan Stadium in San Jose, California. They finished the season as champion of the CCAA with a record of nine wins and three losses (9–3, 5–0 CCAA).

Schedule

Team players in the NFL
The following San Jose State players were selected in the 1949 NFL Draft.

Notes

References

San Jose State
San Jose State Spartans football seasons
California Collegiate Athletic Association football champion seasons
San Jose State Spartans football